Hi-Tech Park Station (Vietnamese: Ga Khu Công nghệ cao) is a future elevated Ho Chi Minh City Metro station on Line 1. Located in Saigon Hi-Tech Park, the station is planned to open in 2024.

References

Ho Chi Minh City Metro stations
Proposed buildings and structures in Vietnam
Railway stations scheduled to open in 2024